The Heavy Hearts are an alternative rock band from Seattle, Washington. The band consists of four members, Brian Burnside who's the guitarist and vocalist. Deneise Burnside who is one of the bassists and is also a vocalist. Slice Kraft, who is the second bassist. And lastly Lee Taylor, the drummer. Alternate bassist Dan Schwartz also played with The Heavy Hearts.
The Heavy Hearts were founded in 2001 as Triple X Audio and were also known as XXX Audio before they obtained their current name. They changed their name to the Heavy Hearts in 2006, and released their self-titled debut EP later that year.  

The band's two frontpeople are Brian Burnside and his wife Denise Burnside (née Maupin). Maupin is the daughter of Seattle City Councilman Will Maupin.

History

Discography

As Triple X Audio
Like Pumping Gas On Fire (Mattress Actress, 2003)
Wreckage and Reclamation (Mattress Actress EP, 2006)

As The Heavy Hearts
The Heavy Hearts (The Swingline EP, 2006)
A Killer of Snakes (Selector Sound, 2008)

References

Musical groups from Seattle
Alternative rock groups from Washington (state)
Musical groups established in 2001
2001 establishments in Washington (state)
American punk rock groups
American garage rock groups